Marek Bajan (born 29 July 1956) is a Polish modern pentathlete. He competed at the 1980 Summer Olympics.

References

External links
 

1956 births
Living people
People from Kraśnik
Polish male modern pentathletes
Olympic modern pentathletes of Poland
Modern pentathletes at the 1980 Summer Olympics
Sportspeople from Lublin Voivodeship